The 2018 D1 Grand Prix series is the eighteenth season for the D1 Grand Prix series. The season began on March 31 at Maishima Sports Island in Osaka, and ended on November 3 at the Odaiba Tokyo Street Course. This season also marked the commencement of the new D1 Lights series, with the preseason match on January 20, at Nikko Circuit, with the season ending on December 1 at the same venue.

Teams and drivers

Schedule

Drivers' rankings

D1GP

References

External links
  

D1 Grand Prix seasons
D1 Grand Prix